Russell Charles Hitchcock (born 15 June 1949) is an Australian musician and lead vocalist of the soft rock duo Air Supply.

Early life
Born in Melbourne, Hitchcock attended South Brunswick State School, and later studied at Princes Hill High School in Carlton North. In 1965, he left school to work as a salesman. At that time, he played the drums and was the lead vocalist in a band called "19th Generation". At the age of 20, Hitchcock obtained a job at a computer company where he continued work for three years, before being promoted and transferred to Sydney.

Career
After meeting British musician Graham Russell in 1975 on the set of a production of Jesus Christ Superstar, Air Supply was formed. The group went on to have many hit records from 1976 into the 1990s; among their biggest hits are "All Out of Love", "The One That You Love", "Lost in Love" and "Making Love Out of Nothing at All".

After the band took a break in 1987, Hitchcock released several solo singles followed by his self-titled solo debut album in 1988. In 1990, the single "Swear to Your Heart" was released, which is from the soundtrack of the film Arachnophobia.

In 1991, Air Supply made a comeback with the album The Earth Is ... featuring the singles "Without You" and "Stronger Than the Night". In 1995, Hitchcock recorded a duet, "Is It You", with Rita Coolidge from her album Behind the Memories.

Discography

Solo albums
1988: Russell Hitchcock
2009: Take Time
2011: Tennessee: The Nashville Sessions

Singles
1987: "Someone Who Believes in You"
1987: "The River Cried"
1987: "Dreams of the Lonely"
1988: "The Sun Ain't Gonna Shine (Anymore)"
1988: "What Becomes of the Brokenhearted" (U.S. AC #39)
1989: "De Todos Modos (with Ednita Nazario)"
1990: "Swear to Your Heart" (U.S. AC #9)
1995: "Is It You (feat. Rita Coolidge)"
1997: "I Am Australian" (with Judith Durham featuring Mandawuy Yunupingu)

Personal life
In 1983, he, along with Graham Russell, relocated from Australia to the US as members of Air Supply. Hitchcock married flight attendant Paula Fulmer in 1986 but they subsequently divorced. In 2000 he married Laurie Parker with whom he had two children, but they also divorced. His third wife is Deanna Bracey. Hitchcock lives in Atlanta. In 2021, he tested positive to COVID-19, postponing two shows in Beverly Hills and Oak Grove, Kentucky.

References

External links

Russell Hitchcock official site, April 2011 archive

1949 births
Living people
Australian soft rock musicians
Air Supply members
Musicians from Melbourne
Ballad musicians
Arista Records artists
20th-century Australian male singers